Russell Stannard,  (December 24.5 1931 – 4 July 2022) was a British high-energy particle physicist. 

Stannard was born in London, England, on December 24.5 1931. He held the position of Professor Emeritus of Physics at the Open University. In 1986, he was awarded the Templeton UK Project Award for "significant contributions to the field of spiritual values; in particular for contributions to greater understanding of science and religion". He was awarded the OBE for "contributions to physics, the Open University, and the popularisation of science" (1998) and the Bragg Medal and Prize of the Institute of Physics for "distinguished contributions to the teaching of physics" (1999). He was admitted as a Fellow of University College London in 2000.

Stannard was also a sculptor; two of his pieces were on display in the main quadrangle of the Open University site at Milton Keynes.

In 2010, he helmed a series of ten short programmes collectively entitled "Boundaries of the knowable", dealing with subjects from both scientific and philosophical perspectives, ranging from the nature of consciousness, the nature of matter, space and time, the wave-particle duality of matter, the existence of extra-terrestrial life and infinite universes, whether our universe is eternal, and the question of "What caused the Big Bang?".

Stannard died on 4 July 2022, at the age of 90.

Career
 Studied Physics at University College London earning a B.Sc. (Special Physics) degree (1953); this was followed by a Ph.D. in cosmic ray physics (1956).
 1960–69 Lecturer, UCL
 1969–71 Reader, Open University
 1971–1997 Professor of Physics, Open University.
 1971–1992 Head of the Physics Department, Open University
 1974–1976 Pro-Vice Chancellor, Open University
 1987–1988 Visiting Fellow, Center of Theological Inquiry, Princeton, United States.
 1987–1991 Vice President of the Institute of Physics.
 1993–1999 Trustee of the John Templeton Foundation.
 1999–2022 Emeritus Professor of Physics, Open University.

Publications

Science and religion
 Science and the Renewal of Belief
 Grounds for Reasonable Belief
 Doing Away with God?
 Science and Wonders
 contributed chapters to Evidence of Purpose, How Large is God?, and Spiritual Evolution.
 The God Experiment, Faber and Faber/HiddenSpring 1999 based on his Gifford Lectures
 The End of Discovery
 Science & Belief the Big Issues
 The Divine Imprint

Children's books

Stannard wrote eleven children's books, including:
 the Uncle Albert trilogy (The Time and Space of Uncle Albert, Black Holes and Uncle Albert, and Uncle Albert and the Quantum Quest)
 An update of George Gamow's Mr Tompkins
 The Curious History of God
 Our Physical Universe
 Virtutopia

Sources

 Biography

External links
Gifford Lectures biography page on Russell Stannard
 Boundaries of the knowable, Open University  short series of video programmes
Russell Stannard Interview with Nigel Bovey

1931 births
2022 deaths
Academics of the Open University
Academics of University College London
Alumni of University College London
British nuclear physicists
English physicists
Officers of the Order of the British Empire
English Christians
Writers about religion and science
Writers from London